Nguyễn Quốc Trung also called Quoc Trung was born 17 September 1966, is a public entertainment figure, composer, sound arranger and record producer.  Since the early 1990s, he has been regarded as of the one most influential music producers in Vietnam’s pop music industry. A local household name in the music industry, he enjoys a large following on Vietnamese television. Quoc Trung distinguishes himself as a man of vision with innovative approaches in the Music business. His creative works set the standards for Vietnamese pop culture and inspires numerous contemporaries and emerging artists.

Recent activities and on-going projects
A deep thinker and visionary, Quoc Trung yearns to reach out as far as his music with take him, beyond his birth country all the while introducing current new sounds to music listeners in Vietnam. One of his goals is moving the Vietnamese music industry towards more standardized practices with intellectual property and copyright laws.  Quoc Trung has collaborated with various international artists, and performed in many countries including for the Royal Family in Japan.  He has taken part in esteemed music festivals such as the Montreux Jazz Festival - France, Roskilde Music Festival - Denmark and many other festivals in Asia.  He recently announced he is gearing up to put forward Music Festivals in Vietnam that will bring more international music and performers from other parts of the globe. His Work and experience include:

The Hanoi Monsoon Music Festival 2014 is a 3-day event of live performances of various musical genres. With over 100 performers ranging from foreign and local artists such as Julien Sato (France), Dj Van Cliffe (Japan), 9Bach (Wales), Benjamin Schoos (Belgium), Carpark North (Denmark), Lulu Rouge (Denmark), Dominic Miller (UK-Argentina), Yi Sung Yol (South Korea). Influential veterans and up-and-coming Vietnamese artist in the likes of Diva Thanh Lam, Diva Trần Thu Hà, 5 Dòng Kẻ band, Ngũ Cung (Pentatonic) band, Kop Band, Rhapsody Philharmonic group, DJ Tuấn Kruise, Dj Hoang Touliver, Dj SlimV, rapper Suboi, rapper Kimese... also shared the stage during 2–4 October 2014.

Coach for The Voice of Vietnam, Trung sat on the coveted chair as one of Four coaches in season II in 2013. Although his best contestant, Ha My, did not win the title, her songs, performances, sound arrangements under Quoc Trung's guidance showcased the artist's soul depth and maturity which were appreciated by more seasoned music listeners and audiophiles. With help from his collaborator/assistant  the talented female musician Thien Huong Luu, Quoc Trung team’s contestants performances were most memorable throughout the episodes of season II.

The Roots is a cross-cultural project in collaboration with French-Vietnamese jazz guitarist Nguyen Le. The duo aim to bring Vietnamese folk sounds to a wider audience with the release of two albums in 2013 and through performances at international music festivals. This project was officially launched with a concert, billed as Khởi Nguồn (The Roots- Beginning) on September 1, 2012 at the prestigious venue Hanoi Opera House. Alongside Quoc Trung and Nguyen Le, the concert featured Vietnamese pop diva Thanh Lam, traditional opera singer Kieu Anh, Tunisian musician Dhafer Youssef, and German percussion artist Rhani Krija.

Judge for Vietnam Idol, the televised singing competition (season 2010 and 2012). A veteran producer and well regarded by his peers, Quoc Trung first appeared on the 3rd season of Vietnam Idol in 2010. He is since dubbed and apprehended by many contestants as Sir Difficult due to his sharp observation, keen ears and unequivocal comments. With his serious yet witty commenting style, Quoc Trung greatly contributed to the unprecedented social media phenomenon and assisted to the rise of 3rd season Vietnam Idol winner Uyen Linh in 2010.

Thanh Viet Production founded by Quoc Trung in 2011, a record label and stage production company. He amiably took Vietnam Idol 2010 winner Uyen Linh under his wings, Quoc Trung produced her first album My Own Dream (Giấc Mơ Tôi) released in February 2011 under Thanh Viet Production. Thanh Viet also put together the annually concert series “Hold Hands when Summer Comes”(Cầm Tay Mùa Hè) and represent several talented young Vietnamese artists.

For earlier works see Personal and Love life, Production Discography.

Early life
Quoc Trung is the only son of Trung Kiên, former vice-minister of Culture and Information in Vietnam, and of Thanh Nga (deceased) a stage performer. Being descendant of performers-artistes, born and raised in Hanoi, Quoc Trung is considered a late-boomer musically, his musical sensibility only became apparent in his early teens, which is uncommon for a child of similar upbringing.

Academic Study
His parents wanted Quoc Trung to follow the path of classical music. Despite his father's intent, young Quoc Trung rather played with his friends, and had only begun to seriously study classical piano at age 12. Quoc Trung progressed quickly with high marks. Unlike his father, a reputable tenor in classical and semi-classical, young Quoc Trung revealed an affinity for Pop music and sound-arrangement.  He opted to pursuit his passion and graduated from the Faculty of Composition at the Hanoi Conservatory of Music.  Quoc Trung was then sent for 2 years to National Music Academy of Sofia in Bulgaria for advanced learning. The National Music Academy of Sofia was unique and renowned musical institution of the Pop genre, in the then communist/socialist countries.

Personal and Love life
Quoc Trung and his wife Thanh Lam knew each other since childhood. When they fell in love they became the inspirational driving force behind each other's rising,  fame and success. Upon returning to Ha Noi, Vietnam in 1991, Quoc Trung founded a music band with like-minded musicians called The Orient. Within two years of its creation, The Orient reached the top spot in the National Music Band Festival. Through Quoc Trung's leadership he transformed the band into the most popular band in North Vietnam. For over a decade, Quoc Trung and his bandmates produced and propelled singer Thanh Lam to stardom and Queen of Pop status, being the first Vietnamese female singer with her own band. As the Diva’s singing performances and career gradually won over public's adulation, so grew the popularity of Quoc Trung and The Orient band from the North Vietnam to South Vietnam over the years.

Unlike their art and collaboration in work that continues until today, the couple separated in 2004, after ten years. Both parted their own ways to collaborate with different entourage and artists. Ex-wife Thanh Lam gave birth to two children, a boy and a girl, aged 17 and 19 respectively (as of 2015). Quoc Trung went on to build a major recording studio, produced most of Vietnam’s biggest singing stars for more than 20 years.

Quoc Trung remained single father for several years after the separation with his first-wife Thanh Lam. He finally found another half and is currently happy in a relationship with a woman who can make his heart sing again.

Influences and Styles
The distinct impression about Quoc Trung is that he possesses the ability to fuse and fine-tuning traditional Vietnamese sounds with modern electronic influences without losing his original pop and folklore identity. Quoc Trung incorporates many Vietnamese traditional strings instruments (Dan Bau, Dan Tranh, Dan Co, etc.), which he blends with digital mixers, samplers, and current Western instruments to create new revitalized tunes. As Quoc Trung gained more experience and exposure over the years in his musical journey, his style evolved and transitioned to what are now considered world/electronic/experimental/ambient/lounge all the while preserving his strong ties to the Vietnamese traditional instruments and sounds.

Quoc Trung has said to be influenced by Phil Colins, Peter Gabriel, Annie Lennox, Willie Nelson, Moby, Massive Attack, The Prodigy, Richard Bona, Björk, Air (French band) etc.

Achievements
Throughout his lifetime Quoc Trung has received a wide range of honours and awards. His reputation firmly established as the top producer and musical authority in Vietnam's music industry. His opinions are flag-bearers and are well respected by the public, professional musicians, artists and producers. In 2012, Quoc Trung was very vocal about the digital intellectual property copyright issue and the distribution of music on Internet websites, who freely broadcast tracks from new Albums with no regards to the artists and their copyrights in Vietnam. He admitted that this is a worldwide problem for the entertainment industry and not unique to Vietnam. His contestation proved to bring results as the Vietnam government starts to clench, regulate and apply profit sharing barometers between these online websites and recording artists.

Beside working as a producer, arranger, music director for shows and festivals, Quoc Trung has also ventured in to the cinema and TV, composed soundtrack commercials, most notably for the Sony brand. He has written music for a number of Asian feature films. His music was even played in the official ads for Vietnam Airlines.

Collaborators
Thanh Lam, Duong Thu, Niels Lan Doky, Nguyen Le, Martin Hedin, Dhafer Youssef, Rhani Krija, Hong Nhung, Stephan Eicher, Tùng Dương, Xavier Desandre Navarre, Bui Huy Tuan, Manu Katche, Truong Anh Quan,
Bent Bitte Iversen, My Linh, Tran Thu Ha, Uyen Linh and others.

Discography
The Roots (2012) - Vòng Tròn (2011) - Wishing Upon the Moon (2011) - Như cánh vạc bay (2006) - Road to Infinity (2005) - Khu vườn yên tĩnh (2004) - Một ngày mới (2003) and more previous works.

Conclusion
Quoc Trung is also known as a devoted recording studio builder. For many years his studio in Ha Noi were second to none, it was the dream venue to record albums and the envy of many composers/producers. Collecting and redistributing studio equipment remain his hobby and it also what keeps this veteran young at heart. As of today, Quoc Trung continues on his chosen path and he is looking forward to challenging himself on a higher level to the world audience with international artists and collaborations.

References

http://www.monsoonfestival.vn/

http://www.talkvietnam.com/2014/03/stop-using-rhino-horn-campaign-launched-in-vietnam/#.UzghNq1dVn8

http://talkvietnam.com/2012/09/cross-cultural-collaboration/#.UFKLk2jyZNE

http://www.allaboutjazz.com/php/article.php?id=42893#.UFKO4WjyZNE

http://www.thanhniennews.com/2010/pages/20120831-a-return-to-the-roots.aspx

http://vnmusic.com.vn/p696-chan-dung-nguoi-dan-ong-bi-hiem-quoc-trung.html

http://www.myspace.com/quoctrung

1966 births
People from Hanoi
Living people